Stralak station is a Via Rail flag stop station located in Stralak, Ontario on the Sudbury – White River train.

External links
Via Rail page for Stralak train station

Via Rail stations in Ontario
Railway stations in Sudbury District